Jakob Andreae (25 March 1528 – 7 January 1590) was a significant German Lutheran theologian and Protestant Reformer involved in the drafting of major documents.

Life
He was born in Waiblingen, in the Duchy of Württemberg. He studied at the University of Tübingen from 1541. He attended the diets of Regensburg (1557) and Augsburg (1559), became professor of theology in the University of Tübingen (1562), and provost of the church of St. George. He was active in Protestant discussions and movements, particularly in the adoption of a common declaration of faith by the two parties.

In 1573 he conducted with the help of Martin Crusius a correspondence with Patriarch Jeremias II of Constantinople, to make contact on behalf of the Lutheran Church with the Eastern Orthodox Church.

He was a signatory of the 1577 Formula of Concord, and editor with Martin Chemnitz of the 1580 Book of Concord. In the latter part of his life he traveled in Bohemia and Germany, working for the consolidation of the Reformation, conferring with pastors, magistrates, and princes. He was the author of more than 150 works, nearly all polemical and vigorously written, for the most part directed against Calvinism.

Andreae represented the Lutheran side in the 1586 Mompelgard Colloquium with Theodore Beza representing the Reformed side. Another name for this event is the Colloquy of Montbéliard. They discussed the doctrines of the Lord's Supper, the person of Christ, predestination, the use of pictures, and ceremonies.

He died in Tübingen, in the Duchy of Württemberg.

He was the father of Johannes Andreae (1554-1601) and the grandfather of Johann Valentin Andreae.

Biographies
Studium Excitare: Biography of Jakob Andreae by Benjamin A. Foxen.
Schmoller, (Gütersloh, 1890).

References

Further reading
 
 Brecht, Martin. "Andreae, Jakob". In: Theologische Realenzyklopädie (TRE) vol. 2, pp. 672–680.
 Ehmer, Hermann. Leben des Jakob Andreae, Doktor der Theologie, von ihm selbst mit grober Treue und Aufrichtigkeit beschriben, bis auf das Jahr 1562. Stuttgart 1991, .
 
 Kolb, Robert. Andreae and the Formula of Concord: Six Sermons on the Way to Lutheran Unity. St. Louis, 1977.
 Kolb, Robert. "Jakob Andreae." Oxford Encyclopedia of the Reformation. (Oxford, 1996). vol. 1. pp. 36–38.
 Jungkuntz, Theodore R. Formulators of the Formula of Concord: Four Architects of Lutheran unity. St. Louis: Concordia Pub. House, 1977.

External links
 Article on Jakob Andreae published in Studium Excitare
 Entry on Jakob Andreä from the 1927 Concordia Cyclopedia
 Entry on Jakob Andeae from the 1975 Christian Cyclopedia
 
 

1528 births
1590 deaths
People from Waiblingen
German Lutheran theologians
16th-century Latin-language writers
History of Swabia
16th-century German Protestant theologians
German male non-fiction writers
16th-century German male writers